Connor Schell is an American producer of television and film. He is the co-creator and executive producer of the 30 for 30 series for ESPN. and for which he has won multiple Emmy Awards and a Peabody Award.  He has executive produced more than 90 episodes of that series.  He is also a creator and executive producer of 30 for 30 shorts for which he also won an Emmy Award. Schell was also an Executive Producer of the documentary film O.J.: Made in America.

From 2017–2020, Schell took on a role as executive vice president and head of content at ESPN. At ESPN, he was responsible for overseeing ESPN's content creation across television, digital (Espn.com and the ESPN App), and print platforms including live event programming and studio programming. 
He is a member of the Peabody Awards board of directors.

Schell left ESPN in 2020 to start a joint venture with Chernin Entertainment, founding the non-fiction production studio Words and Pictures in 2021.

Education and personal life
Schell holds a Bachelor of Arts Degree in History from Harvard University and a Master's in Business Administration (with a focus in Media and Entertainment) from Columbia Business School.

He lives in New York, and is married with three children.

Films
Connor is a producer of the Academy Award-winning 2016 documentary film O.J.: Made in America along with Ezra Edelman, Caroline Waterlow, Libby Geist, Tamara Rosenberg and Nina Krstic. O.J.: Made in America premiered on ABC on June 11, 2016. The film won an Oscar, a Peabody Award, and Best Documentary honors at the Gotham Awards, the Independent Spirit Awards, the IDA Awards, the Producer's Guild Awards, National Board of Review, and NY Film Critics. OJ: Made in America was also honored with special recognition from the AFI and a Dupont Award for Journalism. The documentary originated from conversations between Schell and Edelman in early 2014, and is the longest film ever to win an Oscar. The film was also nominated for six Primetime Emmy Awards.

Along with Bill Simmons, Mark Ciardi, Gordon Gray and Joe Roth, Connor served as an Executive Producer of the 2014 Disney film Million Dollar Arm.

Schell also served as an Executive Producer for the 2016 Disney film Queen of Katwe, the first Disney film on which ESPN Films has a presentation credit.

Television production
The 30 for 30 series, created by Schell and Bill Simmons, was created in 2007 and has aired since 2009. It has won four Emmy Awards and a Peabody Award.  In 2012, Simmons and Schell announced the creation of 30 for 30 shorts.

Working with Maura Mandt and MaggieVision productions, Schell is the executive producer of the annual ESPY Awards on ABC.  He has been the executive producer of the show since 2013.

In 2014, the Disney XD channel premiered the series Becoming which was created by Schell, Bill Simmons, Erin Leyden and Gentry Kirby. Becoming is a series of 30 minute documentaries profiling today's superstar athletes, including LeBron James, Alex Morgan, Tim Howard, Henrik Lundquist, Chris Paul and CC Sabathia. The show is executive produced by Schell and Simmons along with Libby Geist, Maverick Carter and LeBron James.

In 2008, Schell served as an Executive Producer on Dan Klores' four-hour film Black Magic, the first film to run under the ESPN Films brand. Black Magic won a Peabody Award in 2008.

References

External links
 

Year of birth missing (living people)
Living people
American film producers
American television producers
Columbia Business School alumni
Harvard College alumni
Peabody Award winners
Primetime Emmy Award winners
Sports Emmy Award winners